Leonard Griswold Carpenter (July 28, 1902 – May 15, 1994) was an American rower who competed in the 1924 Summer Olympics. In 1924, he was part of the American boat, which won the gold medal in the eights.

References

External links
 
 
 

1902 births
1994 deaths
Hotchkiss School alumni
Olympic gold medalists for the United States in rowing
Rowers at the 1924 Summer Olympics
American male rowers
Medalists at the 1924 Summer Olympics